Fifth-seeded Darlene Hard defeated Yola Ramírez 6–3, 6–4 in the final to win the women's singles tennis title at the 1960 French Championships.

Seeds
The seeded players are listed below. Darlene Hard is the champion; others show the round in which they were eliminated.

  Zsuzsi Körmöczy (second round)
  Maria Bueno (semifinals)
  Florence De La Courtie (third round)
  Ann Haydon (third round)
  Sandra Reynolds (semifinals)
  Darlene Hard (champion)
  Jan Lehane (quarterfinals)
  Yola Ramírez (finalist)
  Edda Buding (third round)
  Bernice Vukovich (third round)
  Silvana Lazzarino (third round)
  Lea Pericoli (third round)
  Vera Puzejova (quarterfinals)
  Renée Schuurman (quarterfinals)
  Christiane Mercelis (third round)
  Mary Hawton (third round)

Draw

Key
 Q = Qualifier
 WC = Wild card
 LL = Lucky loser
 r = Retired

Finals

Earlier rounds

Section 1

Section 2

Section 3

Section 4

References

External links
   on the French Open website

1960 in women's tennis
1960
1960 in French women's sport
1960 in French tennis